Gottfried Landwehr (22 August 1929 – 24 January 2013) was a German physicist.

Landwehr was born in Osnabrück and studied physics in Karlsruhe. After that he worked at the Physikalisch-Technische Bundesanstalt in Braunschweig. He was one of the founders of the Max Planck Institute for Solid State Research in Stuttgart (1955) and headed the branch office in France until 1983. From 1968 to 1999 he was professor for experimental physics in Würzburg.  Klaus von Klitzing who is known for the discovery of the integer quantum Hall Effect in 1980 (Nobel Prize 1985) was one of his students. 
On the initiative of Gottfried Landwehr the well known Centre for semiconductor physics was founded at the Julius-Maximilians-Universität Würzburg. He is also associated with the founding of the chair of applied physics and the department of experimental physics V (biophysics).

Honours and awards 
 Order of Merit of the Federal Republic of Germany
 Bavarian Order of Merit
 2003: Bene Merenti der Universität Würzburg in Gold
 Honorary Doctorate from the University of Gießen
 Honorary Doctorate from the University of Grenoble
 Honorary Member of the Ioffe Physical-Technical Institute of the Russian Academy of Sciences
 Member of the Bavarian Academy of Sciences and Humanities

Online condolence book 
Landwehr died, aged 83, in Würzburg.  The faculty decided to provide an online condolence book for the first time in its history.

References 

1929 births
2013 deaths
20th-century German physicists
Scientists from Osnabrück
Recipients of the Cross of the Order of Merit of the Federal Republic of Germany